The Kampung Boy, also known as Lat, the Kampung Boy or simply Kampung Boy, is a graphic novel by Lat about a young boy's experience growing up in rural Perak in the 1950s.  The book is an autobiographical account of the artist's life, telling of his adventures in the jungles and tin mines, his circumcision, family, and school life.  It is also the basis for the eponymous animated series broadcast in 1999.  First published in 1979 by Berita Publishing, The Kampung Boy was a commercial and critical success; its first printing (of at least 60,000 copies, 16 times) was sold out within four months of its release.  Narrated in English with a smattering of Malay, the work has been translated into other languages, such as Japanese and French, and sold abroad.

The book made Lat an international figure and a highly regarded cartoonist in Malaysia.  It won several awards when released as Kampung Boy in the United States, such as Outstanding International Book for 2007 and the Children's Book Council and Booklist Editor's Choice for 2006. The Kampung Boy became a franchise, with the characters of The Kampung Boy decorating calendars, stamps, and aeroplanes.  A Malaysian theme park is scheduled to open in 2012 with the fictional characters as part of its attractions.  The Kampung Boy is very popular in Southeast Asia and has gone through 16 reprints.  A sequel, Town Boy, which followed the protagonist in his teenage years in the city, was published in 1981 and a spin-off, Kampung Boy: Yesterday and Today, in 1993.  The latter reused the setting of The Kampung Boy to compare and contrast the differences between Malaysian childhood experiences in the 1950s and 1980s.

Plot
The Kampung Boy tells the story of a young boy, Mat, and his childhood in a kampung (village).  A graphic novel, it illustrates the boy's life in pictures and words.  Aside from being the protagonist, Lat is also the narrator. The story opens with his birth in a Kampung in Perak, Malaysia, and the traditional rituals surrounding the event: the recitation of blessings, the singing of religious songs, and the observance of ceremonies. 
As Lat grows older, he explores the house, gradually shifting the story's focus to the comic activities of his family outside their abode.

Lat starts the first stage of his formal education—reading the Qur'an.  At these religious classes, he makes new friends and joins them in their adventures, swimming in the rivers and exploring the jungles.  Lat's parents worry over his lack of interest in his studies; he acknowledges their concern but finds himself unmotivated to forgo play for academic pursuits.  When he reaches his tenth year, he undergoes the bersunat, a ritual circumcision.  The ceremonies that precede the operation are elaborate, with processions and baths in the river.  The circumcision proves to be "just like an ant bite!"

Sometime after recovering from the circumcision, Lat trespasses on a tin mine with his friends.  They teach him how to gather the mud left in the wake of the mining dredges and pan for valuable ore.  The activity is illegal but often overlooked by the miners.  Lat brings the result of his labour back to his father, expecting praise.  Instead, he is punished for neglecting his studies and future.  After overhearing his parents' laments and being shown the family's rubber plantation, Lat finds the will to push himself to study.  He is rewarded for his efforts, passing a "special examination" and qualifying for a "high-standard" boarding school in Ipoh, the state capital.

Rushing home to inform his parents, Lat discovers his father in negotiations with a tin mining company, which is surveying the land.  The company will offer a large sum of money for the family's properties if they discover tin on it.  Other villagers are hoping for similar deals with the company.  They plan to buy houses in Ipoh if their hopes are realised.  The day for Lat to depart the village has arrived and he is excited, but as he is about to depart, sadness washes over him.  He acknowledges the emotions as his love of the village and hopes that the place where he was born will remain unchanged when he returns and see it changed.

Conception
The Kampung Boy is an autobiography.  Its author, Lat, grew up in a kampung and moved to the city after graduating from high school.  He worked there as a crime reporter and drew cartoons to supplement his income—a hobby he had started at the age of nine.  Lat became the column cartoonist for his newspaper after impressing his editors with his cartoons on the bersunat.  He was sent to London to study at St Martin's School of Art and on returning to Malaysia in 1975, he reinvented his column, Scenes of Malaysian Life, into an editorial comic series.  It proved popular and as Lat's fame grew, he began questioning his city lifestyle and reminiscing about his life in the kampung.  Lat felt he and his fellow citizens had all forgotten their village origins and wanted to remind them of that.  He began working on The Kampung Boy in 1977, conceptualising and drawing the scenes when he was not drawing Scenes of Malaysian Life.  His labour came to fruition in 1979 when Berita Publishing Sendirian Berhad released The Kampung Boy on the Malaysian market.

Art style and presentation
The style of Kampung Boy does not follow that commonly found in Western graphic novels.  A page can be occupied fully by a single drawing, accompanied by text.  The image either presents a scene that stands on its own or segues into the next, forming a story sequence that flows across two facing pages.  The story is told in a local dialect of English, simpler in its grammatical structure and sprinkled with Malay words and phrases.  Deborah Stevenson, editor of The Bulletin of the Center for Children's Books, found that the narration invokes a sense of camaraderie with the reader, and carries an "understated affection for family, neighbours and village life."  Mike Shuttleworth, reviewer for The Age, said that Lat often achieved humour in this book by illustrating the scene contrary to what was described.  Stevenson agreed, highlighting a scene in which Mat spoke of how his mother tenderly fed him porridge; the illustration, however, shows her irritation as the toddler spits the porridge back at her.

Kevin Steinberger, reviewer for Magpies, found Lat's layout made Kampung Boy an "easy, inviting read."  He said that Lat's pen-and-ink drawings relied on the "strong contrast between black and white to create space and suggest substance."  Lat drew the children of Kampung Boy as "mostly mop-topped, toothy, bare-bottomed or sarong-draped" kids, who are often "exaggeratedly dwarfed" by items of the adult world.  He explained that the way the boys were drawn was partly due to the influence of comics he read in the 1950s; "naughty ones with ... bushy hair" were prominent male protagonists in those books.  The adult characters are easily distinguished by their exaggerated clothing and accessories such as puffed out pants and butterfly glasses.  "Short and round" shapes make the design of the characters distinctive.  These characters display exaggerated expressions, particularly when they are drawn to face the readers.

Francisca Goldsmith, a librarian and comics reviewer, found Lat's scenes to be "scribbly", yet "wonderfully detailed".  Similarly, comics journalist Greg McElhatton commented that The Kampung Boy was "a strange mix of caricature and careful, fine detail."  These two views lend support to Muliyadi's assertion that Lat demonstrated his strength in The Kampung Boy; his eye for detail extended to his characters and, more importantly, the surroundings.  Lat's characters look, dress, act, and talk like real Malaysians would, and they are placed in environments that are readily identifiable with local jungles, villages, and cities.  The faithful details impart a sense of familiarity to Malaysian readers and make the scenes convincing to others.

Adaptations
New Straits Times, the paper Lat was working for in the 1970s, was published in English; its directive was to serve a multi-racial readership.  Redza commented that Lat understood Malaysian society and the need to engage all of its racial groups.  The Kampung Boy was thus written and published in English.  At Lat's request, Berita Publishing hired his friend, Zainon Ahmad, to translate the graphic novel into Malay.  This version was published under the title Budak Kampung.  By 2008, The Kampung Boy had been reprinted 16 times, and translated into various languages such as Portuguese, French, and Japanese.  Countries that have printed localised versions of The Kampung Boy include Brazil, Germany, Korea and the United States.

United States adaptation
The United States adaptation, which dropped the definite article from the title, was published by First Second Books in 2006.  The book is in a smaller format (6 inches by 8 inches) and sported Matt Groening's testimonial—"one of the all-time great cartoon books"—on its cover.  According to Gina Gagliano, First Second's Marketing Associate, the publishers left the story mostly untouched; they had not altered the contents to be more befitting to American tastes.  They did, however, change the grammar and spelling from British English (the standard followed by Malaysia) to the American version and lettered the text in a font based on Lat's handwriting.  First Second judged that the original book's sprinklings of Malay terms were not huge obstacles to their customers.  Most of the Malay words could be clearly understood from context, either through text or with the accompanying illustrations.  The clarity of the language left the publisher few terms to explain to North American readers; the few that remained were explained either by inserting definitions within parentheses or by replacing the Malay word with an English equivalent.

Animated television series

The success of The Kampung Boy led to its adaptation as an animated series. Started in 1995, production took four years to complete and was an international effort, involving companies in countries such as Malaysia, the Philippines, and the United States.  The series uses the characters of the graphic novel, casting them in stories that bear similarities to The Simpsons.  Comprising 26 episodes, Kampung Boy features themes that focus on the meshing of traditional ways of life with modern living, the balance between environmental conservation and urban development, and local superstitions.  One of its episodes, "Oh! Tok", featuring a spooky banyan tree, won a special Annecy Award for an animated episode of more than 13 minutes in 1999.  Although the pilot episode was shown on television in 1997, the series began broadcasting over the satellite television network Astro in 1999.  Aside from Malaysia, Kampung Boy was broadcast in other countries such as Germany and Canada.

Theatre staging
A theatre staging adaptation, titled Lat Kampung Boy Sebuah Muzikal co-directed by Hans Isaac and Harith Iskander and was staged at the Istana Budaya on 16 March to 3 April 2011. The theatre was co-produced by the Malaysian Institute of Translation & Books and Tall Order Productions. The cast members included Awie, Jalil Hamid, Atilia Haron, Rahim Razali and Douglas Lim.

Reception and legacy
According to Lat, The Kampung Boys first print—60,000 to 70,000 copies—was sold out in three to four months; by 1979, at least 100,000 had been sold.  The Kampung Boy is regarded as Lat's finest work and representative of his oeuvre.  After being published in the United States, Kampung Boy won the Children's Book Council and Booklist Editor's Choice award in 2006.  It was also awarded the Outstanding International Book for 2007 by the United States Board of Books for Young People.

The Kampung Boy was successful due to its realistic presentation of Malaysia's cultural past.  Many Malaysians who grew up in the 1960s or earlier fondly remembered the laidback lives they had in the kampung upon reading the book.  Stevenson said that The Kampung Boys portrayal of the past would resonate with everyone's fondness for a happy experience in his or her own past.  Those unfamiliar with the ways of the kampung could relate to the "universal themes of childhood, adolescence, and first-love".  According to Stevenson, the illustrations help to clarify any unfamiliar terms the reader might face and the narrative force of Lat's story depends more on the protagonist's experiences than on the details.  The book's appeal to both children and adults lies in Lat's success in recapturing the innocence of childhood.

Malaysian art historian Redza Piyadasa said that "The Kampung Boy was a masterpiece that was clearly designed to be read as a novel."  He compared the graphical depiction of childhood experience to Camara Laye's novel The African Child and viewed The Kampung Boy as the "finest and most sensitive evocation of a rural Malay childhood ever attempted in [Malaysia], in any creative medium."  Steinberger had the same thoughts, but compared The Kampung Boy to Colin Thiele's autobiographical novel Sun on the Stubble, which expounds on the fun and mischief of early childhood.

Lat's success with The Kampung Boy created new opportunities for him.  He set up his own company—Kampung Boy Sendirian Berhad (Village Boy private limited)—to handle the merchandising of his cartoon characters and occasional publishing of his books.  Kampung Boy is partnering with Sanrio and Hit Entertainment in a project to open an indoor theme park in Malaysia by the end of 2012.  One of the park's attractions is the showcasing of Lat's characters alongside those of Hello Kitty and Bob the Builder.  The distinctive characters of The Kampung Boy have become a common sight in Malaysia.  They are immortalised on stamps, financial guides, and aeroplanes.

Sequel and spinoff

Town Boy
Town Boy is the sequel to The Kampung Boy.  Published in 1981, it continues Mat's story in the multicultural city of Ipoh, where he attends school, learns of American pop music, and makes new friends of various races, notably a Chinese boy named Frankie.  Mat capers through town and gets into mischievous adventures with his friends.  He and Frankie bond through their common love of rock-and-roll and playing air-guitar to Elvis Presley's tunes above the coffee shop run by Frankie's parents.  As Mat grows into his teens, he dates Normah, "the hottest girl in Ipoh."  Town Boys story is a collection of Lat's reminiscences about his teenage days in Ipoh, an account of "the days before [he] moved to the capital city to venture into life as an adult... and later a professional doodler."  The cartoonist wanted to publicise his knowledge of music and write a subtle story about friendship.  Frankie is representative of the diverse friends Lat made in those days through a common love of music.

The book's layout is more varied than The Kampung Boys, featuring "short multi-panel sequences with giant double-page-spread-drawings."  Comics artist Seth commented that Lat's drawings are filled with "vigor and raw energy", "entirely based on eccentric stylizations but grounded with an eye capable of wonderfully accurate observation of the real world."  At certain points, crowd scenes spread across the pages of the book, filled with "Lat's broadly humorous and humane" characters.  Comics journalist Tom Spurgeon said after readings such scenes: "There are times when reading Town Boy feels like watching through a street fair after it rains, everyday existence altered by an event just enough to make everything stand out. You can get lost in the cityscapes."

The Asian characters occasionally speak in their native tongues, their words rendered in Chinese or Tamil glyphs without translations. Goldsmith and Ridzwan did not find the foreign words to be a hindrance in understanding and enjoying the work.  Instead, they believed the non-English languages aided Lat's construction of his world as one different from a dominantly English-speaking world.  Lat's depiction of Mat's visit to Frankie's home transcends culture, portraying realistically the experiences most children feel when visiting the "foreign but familiar staleness" of their new friend's home.  Mat and Frankie's growing friendship is a central theme of the book, and their bond as they enjoy rock-and-roll together in Frankie's house has become a notable scene for readers such as journalist Ridzwan A. Rahim.  Their friendship marks a shift in the story of Mat's life from a focus on his family in The Kampung Boy to a focus beyond.  As the book revolves around Mat's friendship with Frankie, it ends with the Chinese boy's departure to the United Kingdom from the Ipoh railway station.

As of 2005, Town Boy had been reprinted 16 times.  It has also been translated into French and Japanese.  Reviews of Town Boy were positive.  Librarian George Galuschak liked the book for its detailed crowd scenes and its diverse cast of characters—both animal and human.  The "energy" in Lat's drawings reminded him of Sergio Aragonés and Matt Groening.  Laurel Maury, a reviewer for the Los Angeles Times, likened the book to a Peanuts cartoon, but without the melancholy typical of Charles M. Schulz's work.  She said that Lat delivered a "rollicking" world and that his characters' interactions made the story unpretentious and heart-warming.  Although Spurgeon believed any single scene in Town Boy was superior to any book from a lesser cartoonist, he preferred the narrower scope of The Kampung Boy; he felt the tighter focus of Lat's first book gave a more personal and deeper insight into the author's growth as a young boy.  Town Boy, with its quicker pace, felt to him like a loose collection of heady first-time experiences that failed to explore all possibilities of the encounters.

Kampung Boy: Yesterday and Today
John Lent, a scholar of comics, described Kampung Boy: Yesterday and Today as Lat's "crowning achievement".  Published in 1993, Yesterday and Today returns to Lat's roots as a kampung child as described in The Kampung Boy.  It explores in greater detail the games played by Lat and his friends and the lifestyle they had in the 1960s.  However, Yesterday and Today also compares these past events to similar occurrences in the 1980s and '90s, contrasting the two in a humorous light; the opposition of the two time frames is further enhanced by rendering the portrayals of contemporary scenes in watercolour while those of the past remain in black and white.  Lat's goal for this book was to "tell his own children how much better it was in the old days."

Like in The Kampung Boy, the scenes in Yesterday and Today are presented in great detail.  Lat shows the children playing with items constructed from simple items found in the household and nature.  He also illustrates the toys' schematics.  He compares the games with their modern counterparts, lamenting the loss of creativity in modern youths.  Other comments on societal changes are in the book.  A child is taking a swimming lesson in a pool, intently watched by his parents who have a maid in tow with various items in her hands.  While the parents gesticulate wildly at their son, the lifeguard and instructor calmly sit by the pool, watching the boy's smooth progress.  This scene is contrasted with Lat's own experience at the hands of his father, who casually tosses the terrified boy into a river, letting him either swim or flounder.  Such details, according to Muliyadi, invoke a yearning for the past and help readers "better appreciate [the] cartoons".

University lecturer Zaini Ujang viewed Yesterday and Todays comparisons as criticisms of society, putting forth the question of whether people should accept "development" to simply mean discarding the old for the new without regards to its value.  Professor Fuziah of the National University of Malaysia interpreted the book's ending as a wakeup call to parents, questioning them if they should deny their children a more relaxed childhood.  Lent agreed, saying that Lat had asserted the theme from the start, showing him and his childhood friends "not in a hurry to grow up".  Redza hinted that Lat's other goal was to point out the "dehumanising environment" that Malaysian urban children are growing up in.  A Japanese edition of Yesterday and Today was published by Berita Publishing in 1998.

Notes

References

Bibliography

Interviews/self-introspectives

 
 
 

Books

 
 
 
 
 
 

Academic sources

 
 
 
 
 
 
 
 
 
 

Journalistic sources

 
 
 
 
 
 
 
 
 
 
 
 
 
 
 
 
 
 
 

Online sites

External links
 
 

1979 books
1979 comics debuts
Comics characters introduced in 1979
Autobiographical graphic novels
Malaysian comics titles
Malaysian novels
Malaysian comics
Comics adapted into animated series
Comics adapted into television series
Comics set in Malaysia
First Second Books books